This article displays the qualifying draw of the 2011 Delray Beach International Tennis Championships.

Players

Seeds

Qualifiers

Lucky losers

Qualifying draw

First qualifier

Second qualifier

Third qualifier

Fourth qualifier

References
 Qualifying Draw

2011 - qualifying
Delray Beach International Tennis Championships - qualifying
2011 Delray Beach International Tennis Championships